"Rock Bottom" is a song by American actress and singer Hailee Steinfeld, featuring a guest appearance from American funk pop band DNCE. It was released on February 26, 2016, through Republic Records and Universal Music Group, as the second single from her debut extended play (EP), Haiz (2015). Along with her, Joe Jonas, the lead singer of the band, sings in the song. The song was written by Mattias Larsson, Robin Fredriksson, Julia Michaels, and Justin Tranter, with production being handled by Larsson and Fredriksson under their stage name Mattman & Robin.

Background
In an interview with Peoples Jeff Nelson, Steinfeld said "[Rock Bottom] epitomizes me in every damn relationship. I've experienced that relationship in its entirety. I do feel like there are some songs that really represent a relationship for a relationship, and then when you hear it, you think about that specific relationship, and I have that when I hear 'Rock Bottom'."

Critical reception
Access Hollywood deemed the song "a stylistic, upbeat jam full of swagger and soul." Jeff Nelson of People said "a poppy, effervescent jam, 'Rock Bottom' chronicles the highs and lows of young love that keep a couple 'coming back for more'." Mike Wass of Idolator called "Rock Bottom" "the best song on the EP."

Release
In the weeks prior to Haizs release, "Hell Nos and Headphones" was being touted as the EP's second single, but "You're Such A" was chosen instead, and was set to impact Top 40 radio on February 9, 2016. However, the release of "You're Such A" was scrapped in favor of the new version of "Rock Bottom" featuring DNCE.

Music video
The music video for the song, directed by Malia James, was released on March 25, 2016.
Rolling Stones Brittany Spanos described the music video: "In the clip, Steinfeld struggles with a tumultuous relationship. The singer and her boyfriend, played by model John Economou, shift dramatically between fighting and joking around, which culminates at a show Steinfeld performs at with DNCE. Economou walks out during the performance, and a distraught Steinfeld leaves to find him, where they kiss and make up."

Credits and personnel
Credits have been obtained from AllMusic.

Hailee Steinfeld - vocals/songwriter
Joe Jonas - vocals/songwriter
Mattias Larsson – songwriter
Robin Fredriksson – songwriter
Julia Michaels – songwriter
Justin Tranter – songwriter
Mattman & Robin – producer
JinJoo Lee - guitar
Cole Whittle - bass
Jack Lawless - drums
John Hanes – assistant recording engineer
John Cranfield – assistant recording engineer
Serban Ghenea – mixer
Randy Merrill – mastering engineer

Charts

Certifications

Release history

References

2016 singles
2015 songs
DNCE songs
Hailee Steinfeld songs
Republic Records singles
Songs written by Julia Michaels
Songs written by Justin Tranter
Songs written by Mattias Larsson
Songs written by Robin Fredriksson
Song recordings produced by Mattman & Robin